Louisiana's 8th congressional district is a defunct congressional district and no longer exists after Louisiana lost its eighth congressional seat in the 1990 U. S. Census.  For its entire existence, it was based in Alexandria and included much of the north-central part of the state.

Beginning in 1972, the district was redrawn at the direction of Governor Edwin Edwards to take in liberal precincts in Baton Rouge and along the Mississippi River corridor between Baton Rouge and New Orleans in order to aid the return to Congress of Gillis Long.

List of members representing the district

References

 Congressional Biographical Directory of the United States 1774–present

08
Former congressional districts of the United States
1913 establishments in Louisiana
1993 disestablishments in Louisiana